Wiencke Island is an island  long and from  wide, about  in area, the southernmost of the major islands of the Palmer Archipelago, lying between Anvers Island to its north across the Neumayer Channel and the west coast of the Antarctic Peninsula to its east across the Gerlache Strait.

Description

The rocky island is mostly covered by glaciers, snow and ice. Some small rocky beaches lie on the western and northern sides of the island. There, some grasses, moss and lichens can be found. Luigi Peak is the island's summit, despite it never having been completely surveyed.

Wiencke's northernmost point is Cape Astrup, a bold, dark-colored bluff discovered by the Belgian Antarctic Expedition, 1897–99. It was named by Adrien de Gerlache for Eivind Astrup, Norwegian Arctic explorer and member of Robert Peary's expeditions to Greenland in 1891–92 and 1893–95. The very southeast end of the island is Principal Point, a prominent ice-covered headland lying 4 nautical miles (7 km) east of Cape Errera. Principal Point was first charted by the French Antarctic Expedition under Charcot, 1903–05. The name, applied by the Argentine Antarctic Expedition, 1953–54, suggests the prominence of the feature. Nearby on the southeast coast is Pursuit Point, an Important Bird Area.

History

19th century
The island seems to have been discovered first by Edward Bransfield on board the brig Williams in January 1820, though he named it a cape. In 1829 Henry Foster (scientist) sailed around the island. In 1873 the German Eduard Dallmann was the first to land on the island, and reported it 'a lonely place'. The island was named by Adrien de Gerlache, leader of the 1897–99 Belgian Antarctic Expedition, after Carl August Wiencke, a Norwegian seaman aboard the expedition ship RV Belgica who was washed overboard in a storm in January 1898.

20th century
Britain set up bases on Deception and in a bay of Wiencke Island in 1944 and another at Hope Bay in 1945, to do weather reporting and to check that there was no German naval activity. Only one of these three bases remains, on Goudier Island in the bay of Port Lockroy, off Jougla Point, near Wiencke Island's south-western end.

An Argentinean light tower was installed in 1947 at Py Point at the southwest end of the Peltier Channel on nearby Doumer Island, and a refuge hut erected in Dorian Bay in 1957, north of Port Lockroy. British Antarctic Survey (BAS) erected a staging hut, known as the Damoy Point refuge, near this Argentinean refuge in 1975 to act as a base for a temporary summer aircraft ice-strip. This was taken out of use in 1995, and stands restored as a historic site.

Another scientific station (Yelcho) was established in 1962 by the Chilean Navy in South Bay on nearby Doumer Island. An emergency shelter was built in 1957 in Alice Creek 150 m south of Goudier Island on the east coast of the island, followed two years later by a larger hut, for use when maintaining a  low-frequency electromagnetic aerial and remote receiving equipment. These two huts were removed in 1996 when derelict while Base 'A' on Goudier Island was restored.

Features
 Comer Range
 Jabet Peak
 Noble Peak
Dayné Peak
Tombstone Hill (Palmer Archipelago)

See also 
 Gerlache Strait Geology
 List of Antarctic and subantarctic islands

References

External links 
 UK Antarctic Heritage Trust - The trust manages the historic site at Port Lockroy (Base A).
 

 
Islands of the Palmer Archipelago